The 1978 Critérium du Dauphiné Libéré was the 30th edition of the cycle race and was held from 29 May to 5 June 1978. The race started in Thonon-les-Bains and finished in Carpentras. The race was won by Michel Pollentier of the Flandria team.

Teams
Ten teams, containing a total of 100 riders, participated in the race:

 
 
 
 
 
 
 
 Lejeune–BP

Route

General classification

References

1978
1978 in French sport
1978 Super Prestige Pernod
May 1978 sports events in Europe
June 1978 sports events in Europe